Hypericum musadoganii is a species of flowering plant in the family Hypericaceae.

References

musadoganii